The Portuguese football leagues are divided into divisions (divisões, singular – divisão). The top teams play in the Primeira Liga, named Liga NOS for sponsorship reasons. In each division, with rare exceptions, a team plays all other teams twice, once at home and once away. One can divide the competitions in professional and non-professional.

The Portuguese league and federation teams compete in Europe under UEFA, most notably in the UEFA Champions League, but also in the UEFA Cup, in the extinct Cup Winners' Cup and sometimes in the UEFA Intertoto Cup, European Super Cup and the extinct UEFA/Conmebol Intercontinental Cup (Toyota Cup). They can also compete in the FIFA Club World Cup, although until today no Portuguese team reached this recent competition. The teams also compete in a domestic cup competition each year, called Cup of Portugal (Taça de Portugal) and the winners play against the champions in the SuperCup Cândido de Oliveira.

Current hierarchical divisional breakdowns

Professional
Primeira Liga - First Division (18 teams)
Segunda Liga - Second Division (18 teams)
Non-professional
Campeonato de Portugal - Third Division (72 teams)
Portuguese District First Levels - Fourth Division
Portuguese District Second Levels - Fifth Division
Portuguese District Third Levels - Sixth Division
Portuguese District Fourth Levels - Seventh Division

Primeira Liga teams (2018–19 season)

Segunda Liga teams (2018–19 season)

Campeonato de Portugal teams (2018–19 season)

Serie A

Serie B

Serie C

Serie D

Notable extinct teams
Riopele
União de Lisboa

See also
Portuguese football competitions
Football in Portugal
Portuguese Footballer of the Year

Portugal
 
clubs
Football clubs

ru:Список футбольных клубов Португалии